Dworek Jana Matejki w Krzesławicach is a museum in Kraków, Poland. It was established in 1965 in Krzesławice, Lesser Poland Voivodeship.

External links
 
 

Museums in Kraków
Museums established in 1966
Historic house museums in Poland
Art museums and galleries in Poland